Congregation Beth Israel is a Conservative synagogue, located for most of its history at 144 York Street in Bangor, Maine.  The oldest continuously operating synagogue in Maine, it was organized in 1888 after an influx to Maine of Lithuanian and Polish Jews.  There was a previous community of German Jews from the 1850s named Congregation Ahawas Achim (founded in 1849), who gradually assimilated or left Maine, leaving behind the Webster Street cemetery plot now maintained by the Bangor Jewish community.

The synagogue has an active Sisterhood, leads a community-wide Chevra Kadisha, and has an active Hebrew school.

Congregation Beth Israel has taken on Torah scrolls and memorial boards for Temple Israel in Old Town, Maine, Congregation Chiam Yosef in Calais, Maine, and the Aroostook Hebrew Community synagogue in Presque Isle, Maine.

Early history
The first of Beth Israel's founders, Ezriel Lemke Allen, arrived in Bangor in 1882, after Ike Wolper, an Oldtown peddler, convinced him to leave Boston to pursue work in Maine.  They were joined by Jacob Altman, Harry Cohen, Israel Goldman, Joe Byer, Joe Bernstein, Marks Goldman, Philip Hillson, and Simon Kominsky forming the first formal minyan of Bangor's Eastern European Jewish community.  When they were joined by mohel and shochet Morris Golden, their rituals became more formal, and with a Torah on loan from Ohabei Shalom of Boston, in October 1888 they created the Beth Israel Society.

On August 22, 1897, the cornerstones were emplaced on Center Street, between Cumberland and Garland Street.  This would be the first synagogue constructed in the state of Maine.

On April 30, 1911, the Great Fire of 1911 destroyed much of downtown Bangor, and Beth Israel's Center Street building along with it.  With a $4000 insurance payment as the basis, on March 9, 1913, the present Beth Israel building was dedicated.  It features "Byzantine-Romanesque" architecture to reflect the origins of Jewish life in Asia Minor.

Full-time rabbis

Notes

References

External links
Congregation Beth Israel website

Conservative synagogues in the United States
1888 establishments in Maine
Synagogues in Maine
Religious organizations established in 1888
Synagogues completed in 1897
Buildings and structures in Bangor, Maine
Byzantine Revival synagogues
Romanesque Revival synagogues
Synagogues completed in 1913